The 1903 Svenska Mästerskapet was the eighth season of Svenska Mästerskapet, the football Cup to determine the Swedish champions. Göteborgs IF won the tournament by defeating Göteborgs FF in the final with a 5–2 score.

Semi-finals

Final

References 

Print

1903
Svenska
Mas